The Canal Zone Police was a U.S. Federal Government-based American overseas police force that consisted of more than 400 officers and was responsible for the security of Panama Canal Zone property, as well as general policing duties, using a wide range of transportation, including boats, horses, motorcycles, and patrol cars. The force was split into two divisions, Atlantic and Pacific, and operated about 25 stations. As a result of this, the Canal Zone was much safer. The force was disbanded on March 31, 1982, when law enforcement responsibilities for the former Panama Canal Zone passed to the Republic of Panama as mandated by the Torrijos–Carter Treaties of 1977. Today, the Panamanian National Police, the seniormost branch of the Panamanian Public Forces, is responsible for law enforcement on the wide Canal complex.

Between 1941 and 1957 three Canal Zone Police officers were killed in separate incidents. Each officer was on motorcycle patrol and was forced off the road by a speeding car. No suspects were ever charged with the killings.

Original Canal Zone Police uniforms were military with a campaign hat. Later uniforms were more in line with US state police. Headwear ranged from octagonal peaked cap to Stetson cavalry hat.

External links 
CZP History by Chief William F. Kessler

Defunct federal law enforcement agencies of the United States
History of the Panama Canal Zone